Ivor Egwad Jones CBE (10 December 1901 – 16 November 1982) was a Welsh rugby union player who played as a back-row forward, mainly at flanker, for Llanelli and won 19 caps for Wales, three of them as captain.

Jones was born in Loughor and joined Loughor RFC after leaving school, playing his first match for them at the age of 15. After playing a few games for Swansea he moved to Llanelli in 1922. He played for Llanelli until 1938, apart from a short period with Birmingham in 1924–25, and scored more than 1,200 points for the club. He captained Llanelli from 1925 to 1928, 1930 to 1932 and 1933 to 1936, and led them to the Welsh club title three times between 1927 and 1933.

He won his first cap for Wales in 1924 against England and made his last appearance as captain against Scotland in 1930. He was selected for the British and Irish Lions on their tour to Australia and New Zealand in 1930 and played in all five tests. Jones was generally considered to have been one of the outstanding players on that tour, but was never selected for Wales again.

After retiring as a player, Jones became chairman of the Welsh selectors, President of the Welsh Rugby Union and a Justice of the Peace.

Quotations
Harry Bowcott, former Wales captain and fellow tourist on the 1930 British and Irish Lions tour to Australia New Zealand, speaking of the opening win in the series for the tourists:
It was a very cold day. There were snow showers before the game and a blizzard during it. We changed at the hotel and it was entirely due to Ivor Jones, the king of the tour, that we got off to a winning start. He broke clear at our ten-yard line and went all the way downfield so that there was only George Napia, the New Zealand full-back, left to stop him. He drew Napia and slipped the ball to Jack Morley for him to get over in the corner. We'd beaten this wonderful team called the All Blacks, much to their disgust. We were delighted. 

Author Peter Jackson on Ivor Jones:
No Lion, though, made as great an impact on New Zealand as Ivor Jones, the Llanelli back-row forward. They called him 'The King', and a few survivors of the oldest generation scattered around both islands still do. Jones, who devoted a lifetime to the service of Welsh rugby in many guises, including chairman of selectors and president, was almost a one-man team.

References

1901 births
1982 deaths
British & Irish Lions rugby union players from Wales
Commanders of the Order of the British Empire
Llanelli RFC players
Rugby union flankers
Rugby union players from Loughor
Swansea RFC players
Wales international rugby union players
Wales rugby union captains
Wales Rugby Union officials
Welsh rugby union players